"Close to You" is a song by German Eurodance band Fun Factory, released in March 1994 as the second single from their debut-album, NonStop (1994). The song received positive reviews from music critics, peaking at number-one on the Canadian RPM Dance/Urban chart and at number 22 on the US Billboard Hot Dance Club Play chart. Additionally, it peaked at number 46 on the Billboard Hot 100 and number 14 on the Billboard Hot Dance Music/Maxi-Singles Sales chart. In Europe, the song reached number 19 in Germany and number 97 in the UK. It uses the same melody as the 1993 hit single "Hold On" by German group Loft.

Critical reception
Larry Flick from Billboard wrote that "taking a cue from Snap, this European-flavored dance anthem mixes soaring vocals with house beats and a snazzy rap. Multiple synthesizer riffs, a booming bass, and an amorous melody should keep the dance floor jumpin'." In 1995, "Close to You" was described as a "slick dance/pop ditty" and a "unabashedly gleeful twirler". Flick complimented the song's "contagious energy" and noted that "by the end of this toe-tapper, you will be singing along with the chorus as if it were second nature-the mark of a real hit." 

Pan-European magazine Music & Media stated that "at 120+ bpm, Fun Factory's hard-edged techno experience is among the faster house tracks now storming charts everywhere." They added, "Thanks to a convincing chorus and a strong hook, its quick jump to number 22 in the German sales charts doesn't come as a surprise." Alan Jones from Music Week commented, "Marie-Annette sings, Rod D raps and the hugely commercial chorus surfaces at frequent intervals to reinforce the message that this is yet another continental invader that is bound for UK glory." Stephen Meade from The Network Forty declared it as a "high-energy dance track guaranteed to put a smile on your face." James Hamilton from the RM Dance Update called it a "typical girl cooed and guy rapped cheesy German galloper".

Music video
A music video was produced to promote the single, directed by Swedish director Stefan Berg. It was A-listed on Germany's VIVA in June 1994 and later published on Fun Factory's official YouTube channel in August 2015.

Track listing
 12" (Remixes), Germany
"Close to You" (Energy Trance Mix) – 8:23
"Close to You" (Trance Radio Cut) – 3:40
"Close to You" (Peace & Positive Mix) – 5:42
"Close to You" (Doug's Club Mix) – 6:04
"Close to You" (Doug's Apple Mix) – 5:06

 CD single, France
"Close to You" (Radio Edit) – 3:36
"Close to You" (Close To Ragga Mix - Radio Edit) – 3:50

 CD maxi, Europe
"Close to You" (Radio Edit) – 3:36
"Close to You" (Trouble Mix) – 4:36
"Close to You" (Close To Ragga Remix) – 4:49
"Fun Factory's Groove" (Instrumental) – 5:34 

 CD maxi, US
"Close to You" (Radio Edit) – 3:35
"Close to You" (Trouble Mix) – 4:45
"Close to You" (Close To Ragga Mix) – 4:48
"Fun Factory's Groove" (Instrumental) – 5:33
"Close to You" (Close To Trance Remix) – 5:09

Charts

Weekly charts

Year-end charts

References

1994 singles
1994 songs
English-language German songs
Fun Factory (band) songs
Music videos directed by Stefan Berg
Songs written by Bülent Aris
Songs written by Toni Cottura